Cork United Football Club was a League of Ireland club based in Cork from 1940 until 1948.

History
Cork United was formed in February 1940 upon the dissolution of Cork City. The new club took Cork City's place and that season's playing record in the League of Ireland. The new club enjoyed a golden age in the early 1940s, winning five league titles, before disbanding and resigning from the league on 10 October 1948. Another new club, Cork Athletic was immediately formed to take its place.

Honours

League of Ireland: 5
  1940–41, 1941–42, 1942–43, 1944–45, 1945–46FAI Cup: 21940–41, 1946–47League of Ireland Shield: 21942–43, 1947–48Dublin City Cup: 21943–44, 1945–46Munster Senior Cup'''
1940–41, 1944–45 (Reserves), 1946–47

Season placings

Notable former players
Ireland (FAI) internationals

Ireland (IFA) internationals
   Bill Hayes
   Owen Madden
   Sean McCarthy
   Jackie O'Driscoll

Great Britain international
  Kevin McAlinden

League of Ireland Top Scorer

Other sports
  Ned Courtney – played Gaelic football for Cork
  Tommy Moroney – played rugby union for Munster

See also
League of Ireland in Cork city

References

 
Association football clubs in County Cork
Defunct League of Ireland clubs
Association football clubs in Cork (city)
Association football clubs established in 1940
Association football clubs disestablished in 1948
1940 establishments in Ireland
1948 disestablishments in Ireland